Proyekt Maslul is the Israeli version of the American reality show Project Runway.

History
Proyekt Maslul was filmed during the winter of 2008–2009 and premiered on June 17, 2009. The show featured 13 Israeli designers competing to become "the next big fashion designer". The winner was Alon Livne. 

The show was hosted by Shiraz Tal, an Israeli model. It ran for one season.

Season 1 contestants
The 13 Designers are:

Season 1 challenges 

 Light blue background and HIGH means the designer had one of the highest scores
 Green background and WINNER means the designer won Project Runway.
 Blue background and WIN means the designer won the challenge.
 Red background and OUT means the designer was eliminated.
 Pink background and LOW means the designer was in the bottom 3, but was not eliminated.
 Orange background and LOW means the designer was in the bottom 2, but was not eliminated.

Episode 1
The premiere episode of Project Runway Israel showed host Shiraz Tal introducing the thirteen designers. The designers were given their first challenge: design a dress inspired by one of Rita Kleinstein's songs. The designers made their way to their new home and studio where they began to work. At the studio, drama occurred when Meshie found it hard to design her dress and asked for help. When contestants helped her, she caused trouble and they got mad at her for her poor attitude. At the end of the 48-hour time limit, the models walked the runway in front of the judges. Tao disappointed the judges and was eliminated.
Judges: Vei Bleish, Sason Kedem, Shiraz Tal, Gal Afel
Guest Judge: Rita Kleinstein
WINNER: Lucy
OUT: Tao
First Aired: June 17, 2009

Episode 2
During the 2nd episode, the designers went to a stall shop in Jaffa, Israel. They had a quick challenge to pick out the ugliest clothing they could find. Yoav won the challenge. The designers were then given their challenge: to design a sexy undergarment from the ugly clothing they had taken from the stalls for Hadas & Inbal, former contestants (a.k.a. The Blondes) from the reality TV show HaMerotz LaMillion to wear in a fashion magazine. Guy failed to design, and reconstructed his underwear several times. Moran got frustrated when she couldn't find the correct materials to finish her dress. Moran won the challenge. The weakest three were Guy, Maria, and Netanel, who didn't manage to create a beautiful underwear garment. Guy and Maria landed in the bottom two, but Guy was given another chance and Maria was sent home.
Judges: Gal Afel, Shiraz Tal 
Guest Judge(s): Hadas & Inbal, unknown guest designer.
WINNER: Moran
OUT: Maria
First Aired: June 24, 2009.

Episode 3
In the third episode, the designers were given a challenge to create a dress out of fabrics from a local supermarket. Everyone was working hard on their own dresses, except Yoav, who helped other people and neglected his own dress. Alon won his first challenge while Yoav and Ofir landed in the bottom two. Ofir was sent home.
Judges: Vei Bleish, Shiraz Tal, Gal Afel
Guest Judge: None
WINNER: Alon
OUT: Ofir
First Aired: July 1, 2009.

See also
Israeli fashion
Television in Israel

External links
 
 Alon Livne's Official Website

Israel
Israeli reality television series
Channel 2 (Israeli TV channel) original programming
2009 Israeli television series debuts
2009 Israeli television series endings
2009 in fashion
2000s Israeli television series
Israeli fashion